Mentallo & The Fixer Meets Mainesthai is a collaborative remix album by Mentallo & The Fixer and Mainesthai, released in 1994 by Zoth Ommog Records.

Music
The band originally sent the recording sessions that comprised Mentallo & The Fixer Meets Mainesthai to Zoth Ommog as a work in progress and the album was released early before it could meet the band's approval. On June 23, 1998 the album was re-released by Metropolis Records in remastered form with an alternate track listing that replaces several of the songs on the original issue.

Reception
In their review of Mentallo & The Fixer Meets Mainesthai, Ink 19 commended the remixes for improving the originals and commented that the album would be a good introduction to Mentallo & The Fixer for new listeners.  Sonic Boom gave the album a positive review and noting the standouts as being the "Basket Case remix of 'Wartime' with its brutal cadence and the Tribulation mix of 'Power Struggle' with all of its Demon Seed samples."

Track listing

Personnel
Adapted from the Mentallo & The Fixer Meets Mainesthai liner notes.

Musicians
 Dwayne Dassing (as The Fixer) – programming, producer, engineering and mixing
 Gary Dassing (as Mentallo) – programming, producer, engineering and mixing
 Michael Greene – vocals, producer, engineering and mixing (5, 6, 8, 9)

Production and design
 Ric Laciak – recording (23)
 André Menge (as Menge Design Group) – cover art
 Chris Spoonts – mastering

Release history

References

External links 
 

1994 remix albums
Mainesthai albums
Mentallo & The Fixer albums
Metropolis Records remix albums
Zoth Ommog Records remix albums